"Polypoetes" cuatropuntada is a moth of the family Notodontidae first described by Paul Dognin in 1893. It is found in Ecuador.

Taxonomy
The species does not belong in Polypoetes, but has not been placed in another genus yet.

References

Moths described in 1893
Notodontidae of South America